Menna Hamed (born 30 January 1998 in Cairo) is an Egyptian professional squash player. As of February 2018, she was ranked number 55 in the world.

References

1998 births
Living people
Egyptian female squash players
21st-century Egyptian women